Brett Alan Tucker (born 21 May 1972) is an Australian actor and singer. He was a series regular in  The Saddle Club, McLeod's Daughters, and Mistresses. He is also known for his role as Daniel Fitzgerald in Neighbours. He played Seattle Fire Chief Lucas Ripley on ABC's TV series Station 19.

Acting career 
Tucker attended National Theatre, Melbourne.

For his role as Dave Brewer on the drama McLeod's Daughters, he apprenticed with a real country veterinarian to research his role.

Tucker's onstage credits include The Woman in Black in 2006, and The Great Gatsby playing Jay Gatsby' in 1997.

From 1999 to 2000, he played the role of Daniel Fitzgerald in Neighbours, a role which he returned to in late 2007. In June 2009, it was announced that he would be leaving the show to pursue acting opportunities in the United States. In addition to Neighbours, Tucker played Max in The Saddle Club.

Tucker also had a minor role in the 2005 film The Great Raid.

Since moving to the United States, Tucker has appeared in episodes of CSI: NY, CSI: Crime Scene Investigation, Castle, Rizzoli & Isles and NCIS. He also appeared in Off The Map and the TV film, Criminal Behaviour. Tucker appeared as Harry Davis in Mistresses. During 2018 and 2019, he played Chief Lucas Ripley on Station 19 for 17 episodes.

Tucker stars in the 2021 miniseries Lie With Me alongside Charlie Brooks.

Personal life 
Born one of three sons and one daughter on 21 May 1972 to Ken and Janice Tucker, he grew up in the Yarra Valley of Victoria with his three siblings – Nicky, Mark and David.

Filmography

References

External links
 

Australian male film actors
Australian male stage actors
Australian male soap opera actors
Living people
Male actors from Melbourne
1972 births
Australian expatriate male actors in the United States